

Pe continued...

Peo

|- class="vcard"
| class="fn org" | Peopleton
| class="adr" | Worcestershire
| class="note" | 
| class="note" | 
|- class="vcard"
| class="fn org" | Peover Heath
| class="adr" | Cheshire
| class="note" | 
| class="note" | 
|}

Pep

|- class="vcard"
| class="fn org" | Peper Harow
| class="adr" | Surrey
| class="note" | 
| class="note" | 
|- class="vcard"
| class="fn org" | Peppercombe
| class="adr" | Devon
| class="note" | 
| class="note" | 
|- class="vcard"
| class="fn org" | Pepper Hill
| class="adr" | Calderdale
| class="note" | 
| class="note" | 
|- class="vcard"
| class="fn org" | Peppermoor
| class="adr" | Northumberland
| class="note" | 
| class="note" | 
|- class="vcard"
| class="fn org" | Pepper's Green
| class="adr" | Essex
| class="note" | 
| class="note" | 
|- class="vcard"
| class="fn org" | Pepperstock
| class="adr" | Bedfordshire
| class="note" | 
| class="note" | 
|}

Per

|- class="vcard"
| class="fn org" | Perceton
| class="adr" | North Ayrshire
| class="note" | 
| class="note" | 
|- class="vcard"
| class="fn org" | Percuil
| class="adr" | Cornwall
| class="note" | 
| class="note" | 
|- class="vcard"
| class="fn org" | Percy Main
| class="adr" | North Tyneside
| class="note" | 
| class="note" | 
|- class="vcard"
| class="fn org" | Perham Down
| class="adr" | Wiltshire
| class="note" | 
| class="note" | 
|- class="vcard"
| class="fn org" | Periton
| class="adr" | Somerset
| class="note" | 
| class="note" | 
|- class="vcard"
| class="fn org" | Perivale
| class="adr" | Ealing
| class="note" | 
| class="note" | 
|- class="vcard"
| class="fn org" | Perkhill
| class="adr" | Aberdeenshire
| class="note" | 
| class="note" | 
|- class="vcard"
| class="fn org" | Perkin's Village
| class="adr" | Devon
| class="note" | 
| class="note" | 
|- class="vcard"
| class="fn org" | Perkinsville
| class="adr" | Durham
| class="note" | 
| class="note" | 
|- class="vcard"
| class="fn org" | Perlethorpe
| class="adr" | Nottinghamshire
| class="note" | 
| class="note" | 
|- class="vcard"
| class="fn org" | Perranarworthal
| class="adr" | Cornwall
| class="note" | 
| class="note" | 
|- class="vcard"
| class="fn org" | Perrancoombe
| class="adr" | Cornwall
| class="note" | 
| class="note" | 
|- class="vcard"
| class="fn org" | Perran Downs
| class="adr" | Cornwall
| class="note" | 
| class="note" | 
|- class="vcard"
| class="fn org" | Perranporth
| class="adr" | Cornwall
| class="note" | 
| class="note" | 
|- class="vcard"
| class="fn org" | Perranuthnoe
| class="adr" | Cornwall
| class="note" | 
| class="note" | 
|- class="vcard"
| class="fn org" | Perranwell (Perranzabuloe)
| class="adr" | Cornwall
| class="note" | 
| class="note" | 
|- class="vcard"
| class="fn org" | Perranwell (Perranarworthal)
| class="adr" | Cornwall
| class="note" | 
| class="note" | 
|- class="vcard"
| class="fn org" | Perranwell Station
| class="adr" | Cornwall
| class="note" | 
| class="note" | 
|- class="vcard"
| class="fn org" | Perran Wharf
| class="adr" | Cornwall
| class="note" | 
| class="note" | 
|- class="vcard"
| class="fn org" | Perranzabuloe
| class="adr" | Cornwall
| class="note" | 
| class="note" | 
|- class="vcard"
| class="fn org" | Perrott's Brook
| class="adr" | Gloucestershire
| class="note" | 
| class="note" | 
|- class="vcard"
| class="fn org" | Perry
| class="adr" | Devon
| class="note" | 
| class="note" | 
|- class="vcard"
| class="fn org" | Perry
| class="adr" | Birmingham
| class="note" | 
| class="note" | 
|- class="vcard"
| class="fn org" | Perry
| class="adr" | Kent
| class="note" | 
| class="note" | 
|- class="vcard"
| class="fn org" | Perry Barr
| class="adr" | Birmingham
| class="note" | 
| class="note" | 
|- class="vcard"
| class="fn org" | Perry Beeches
| class="adr" | Birmingham
| class="note" | 
| class="note" | 
|- class="vcard"
| class="fn org" | Perry Common
| class="adr" | Birmingham
| class="note" | 
| class="note" | 
|- class="vcard"
| class="fn org" | Perry Crofts
| class="adr" | Staffordshire
| class="note" | 
| class="note" | 
|- class="vcard"
| class="fn org" | Perryfields
| class="adr" | Worcestershire
| class="note" | 
| class="note" | 
|- class="vcard"
| class="fn org" | Perryfoot
| class="adr" | Derbyshire
| class="note" | 
| class="note" | 
|- class="vcard"
| class="fn org" | Perry Green
| class="adr" | Somerset
| class="note" | 
| class="note" | 
|- class="vcard"
| class="fn org" | Perry Green
| class="adr" | Hertfordshire
| class="note" | 
| class="note" | 
|- class="vcard"
| class="fn org" | Perry Green
| class="adr" | Essex
| class="note" | 
| class="note" | 
|- class="vcard"
| class="fn org" | Perry Green
| class="adr" | Wiltshire
| class="note" | 
| class="note" | 
|- class="vcard"
| class="fn org" | Perrymead
| class="adr" | Bath and North East Somerset
| class="note" | 
| class="note" | 
|- class="vcard"
| class="fn org" | Perrystone Hill
| class="adr" | Herefordshire
| class="note" | 
| class="note" | 
|- class="vcard"
| class="fn org" | Perry Street
| class="adr" | Somerset
| class="note" | 
| class="note" | 
|- class="vcard"
| class="fn org" | Perry Street
| class="adr" | Kent
| class="note" | 
| class="note" |                  
|- class="vcard"
| class="fn org" | Perry Vale
| class="adr" | Lewisham
| class="note" | 
| class="note" | 
|- class="vcard"
|- class="vcard"
| class="fn org" | Perrywood
| class="adr" | Kent
| class="note" | 
| class="note" | 
|- class="vcard"
| class="fn org" | Pershall
| class="adr" | Staffordshire
| class="note" | 
| class="note" | 
|- class="vcard"
| class="fn org" | Pershore
| class="adr" | Worcestershire
| class="note" | 
| class="note" | 
|- class="vcard"
| class="fn org" | Pertenhall
| class="adr" | Bedfordshire
| class="note" | 
| class="note" | 
|- class="vcard"
| class="fn org" | Perth
| class="adr" | Perth and Kinross
| class="note" | 
| class="note" | 
|- class="vcard"
| class="fn org" | Perthcelyn
| class="adr" | Rhondda, Cynon, Taff
| class="note" | 
| class="note" | 
|- class="vcard"
| class="fn org" | Perthy
| class="adr" | Shropshire
| class="note" | 
| class="note" | 
|- class="vcard"
| class="fn org" | Perton
| class="adr" | Staffordshire
| class="note" | 
| class="note" | 
|- class="vcard"
| class="fn org" | Perton
| class="adr" | Herefordshire
| class="note" | 
| class="note" | 
|- class="vcard"
| class="fn org" | Pertwood
| class="adr" | Wiltshire
| class="note" | 
| class="note" | 
|}

Pes

|- class="vcard"
| class="fn org" | Pestalozzi International Village
| class="adr" | East Sussex
| class="note" | 
| class="note" | 
|- class="vcard"
| class="fn org" | Pested
| class="adr" | Kent
| class="note" | 
| class="note" | 
|}

Pet

|- class="vcard"
| class="fn org" | Peterborough
| class="adr" | City of Peterborough
| class="note" | 
| class="note" | 
|- class="vcard"
| class="fn org" | Peterchurch
| class="adr" | Herefordshire
| class="note" | 
| class="note" | 
|- class="vcard"
| class="fn org" | Peterculter
| class="adr" | City of Aberdeen
| class="note" | 
| class="note" | 
|- class="vcard"
| class="fn org" | Peterhead
| class="adr" | Aberdeenshire
| class="note" | 
| class="note" | 
|- class="vcard"
| class="fn org" | Peterlee
| class="adr" | Durham
| class="note" | 
| class="note" | 
|- class="vcard"
| class="fn org" | Petersburn
| class="adr" | North Lanarkshire
| class="note" | 
| class="note" | 
|- class="vcard"
| class="fn org" | Petersfield
| class="adr" | Hampshire
| class="note" | 
| class="note" | 
|- class="vcard"
| class="fn org" | Peter's Finger
| class="adr" | Devon
| class="note" | 
| class="note" | 
|- class="vcard"
| class="fn org" | Peters Green
| class="adr" | Hertfordshire
| class="note" | 
| class="note" | 
|- class="vcard"
| class="fn org" | Petersham
| class="adr" | Richmond Upon Thames
| class="note" | 
| class="note" | 
|- class="vcard"
| class="fn org" | Peters Marland
| class="adr" | Devon
| class="note" | 
| class="note" | 
|- class="vcard"
| class="fn org" | Peterstone Wentlooge
| class="adr" | City of Newport
| class="note" | 
| class="note" | 
|- class="vcard"
| class="fn org" | Peterston-super-Ely
| class="adr" | The Vale Of Glamorgan
| class="note" | 
| class="note" | 
|- class="vcard"
| class="fn org" | Peterstow
| class="adr" | Herefordshire
| class="note" | 
| class="note" | 
|- class="vcard"
| class="fn org" | Peter Tavy
| class="adr" | Devon
| class="note" | 
| class="note" | 
|- class="vcard"
| class="fn org" | Petertown
| class="adr" | Orkney Islands
| class="note" | 
| class="note" | 
|- class="vcard"
| class="fn org" | Peterville
| class="adr" | Cornwall
| class="note" | 
| class="note" | 
|- class="vcard"
| class="fn org" | Petham
| class="adr" | Kent
| class="note" | 
| class="note" | 
|- class="vcard"
| class="fn org" | Petherwin Gate
| class="adr" | Cornwall
| class="note" | 
| class="note" | 
|- class="vcard"
| class="fn org" | Petrockstowe
| class="adr" | Devon
| class="note" | 
| class="note" | 
|- class="vcard"
| class="fn org" | Petsoe End
| class="adr" | Milton Keynes
| class="note" | 
| class="note" | 
|- class="vcard"
| class="fn org" | Pett
| class="adr" | East Sussex
| class="note" | 
| class="note" | 
|- class="vcard"
| class="fn org" | Pettaugh
| class="adr" | Suffolk
| class="note" | 
| class="note" | 
|- class="vcard"
| class="fn org" | Pett Bottom (Brabourne)
| class="adr" | Kent
| class="note" | 
| class="note" | 
|- class="vcard"
| class="fn org" | Pett Bottom (Canterbury)
| class="adr" | Kent
| class="note" | 
| class="note" | 
|- class="vcard"
| class="fn org" | Petteridge
| class="adr" | Kent
| class="note" | 
| class="note" | 
|- class="vcard"
| class="fn org" | Pettinain
| class="adr" | South Lanarkshire
| class="note" | 
| class="note" | 
|- class="vcard"
| class="fn org" | Pettings
| class="adr" | Kent
| class="note" | 
| class="note" | 
|- class="vcard"
| class="fn org" | Pettistree
| class="adr" | Suffolk
| class="note" | 
| class="note" | 
|- class="vcard"
| class="fn org" | Pett Level
| class="adr" | East Sussex
| class="note" | 
| class="note" | 
|- class="vcard"
| class="fn org" | Petton
| class="adr" | Devon
| class="note" | 
| class="note" | 
|- class="vcard"
| class="fn org" | Petton
| class="adr" | Shropshire
| class="note" | 
| class="note" | 
|- class="vcard"
| class="fn org" | Petts Wood
| class="adr" | Bromley
| class="note" | 
| class="note" | 
|- class="vcard"
| class="fn org" | Petty France
| class="adr" | South Gloucestershire
| class="note" | 
| class="note" | 
|- class="vcard"
| class="fn org" | Pettywell
| class="adr" | Norfolk
| class="note" | 
| class="note" | 
|- class="vcard"
| class="fn org" | Petworth
| class="adr" | West Sussex
| class="note" | 
| class="note" | 
|}

Pev

|- class="vcard"
| class="fn org" | Pevensey
| class="adr" | East Sussex
| class="note" | 
| class="note" | 
|- class="vcard"
| class="fn org" | Pevensey Bay
| class="adr" | East Sussex
| class="note" | 
| class="note" | 
|- class="vcard"
| class="fn org" | Peverell
| class="adr" | Devon
| class="note" | 
| class="note" | 
|}

Pew

|- class="vcard"
| class="fn org" | Pewet Island
| class="adr" | Essex
| class="note" | 
| class="note" | 
|- class="vcard"
| class="fn org" | Pewit Island
| class="adr" | Essex
| class="note" | 
| class="note" | 
|- class="vcard"
| class="fn org" | Pewsey
| class="adr" | Wiltshire
| class="note" | 
| class="note" | 
|- class="vcard"
| class="fn org" | Pewsey Wharf
| class="adr" | Wiltshire
| class="note" | 
| class="note" | 
|- class="vcard"
| class="fn org" | Pewterspear
| class="adr" | Cheshire
| class="note" | 
| class="note" | 
|}

Ph

|- class="vcard"
| class="fn org" | Phantassie
| class="adr" | East Lothian
| class="note" | 
| class="note" | 
|- class="vcard"
| class="fn org" | Pharisee Green
| class="adr" | Essex
| class="note" | 
| class="note" | 
|- class="vcard"
| class="fn org" | Pheasants
| class="adr" | Buckinghamshire
| class="note" | 
| class="note" | 
|- class="vcard"
| class="fn org" | Pheasant's Hill
| class="adr" | Buckinghamshire
| class="note" | 
| class="note" | 
|- class="vcard"
| class="fn org" | Pheasey
| class="adr" | Walsall
| class="note" | 
| class="note" | 
|- class="vcard"
| class="fn org" | Phoenix Green
| class="adr" | Hampshire
| class="note" | 
| class="note" | 
|- class="vcard"
| class="fn org" | Phepson
| class="adr" | Worcestershire
| class="note" | 
| class="note" | 
|- class="vcard"
| class="fn org" | Philadelphia
| class="adr" | Sunderland
| class="note" | 
| class="note" | 
|- class="vcard"
| class="fn org" | Philham
| class="adr" | Devon
| class="note" | 
| class="note" | 
|- class="vcard"
| class="fn org" | Philiphaugh
| class="adr" | Scottish Borders
| class="note" | 
| class="note" | 
|- class="vcard"
| class="fn org" | Phillack
| class="adr" | Cornwall
| class="note" | 
| class="note" | 
|- class="vcard"
| class="fn org" | Philleigh
| class="adr" | Cornwall
| class="note" | 
| class="note" | 
|- class="vcard"
| class="fn org" | Phillip's Town
| class="adr" | Caerphilly
| class="note" | 
| class="note" | 
|- class="vcard"
| class="fn org" | Philpot End
| class="adr" | Essex
| class="note" | 
| class="note" | 
|- class="vcard"
| class="fn org" | Philpstoun
| class="adr" | West Lothian
| class="note" | 
| class="note" | 
|- class="vcard"
| class="fn org" | Phocle Green
| class="adr" | Herefordshire
| class="note" | 
| class="note" | 
|- class="vcard"
| class="fn org" | Phoenix Row
| class="adr" | Durham
| class="note" | 
| class="note" | 
|}

Pi

Pia–Pik

|- class="vcard"
| class="fn org" | Pibsbury
| class="adr" | Somerset
| class="note" | 
| class="note" | 
|- class="vcard"
| class="fn org" | Pibwrlwyd
| class="adr" | Carmarthenshire
| class="note" | 
| class="note" | 
|- class="vcard"
| class="fn org" | Pica
| class="adr" | Cumbria
| class="note" | 
| class="note" | 
|- class="vcard"
| class="fn org" | Piccadilly
| class="adr" | Warwickshire
| class="note" | 
| class="note" | 
|- class="vcard"
| class="fn org" | Piccadilly
| class="adr" | Rotherham
| class="note" | 
| class="note" | 
|- class="vcard"
| class="fn org" | Piccadilly Corner
| class="adr" | Norfolk
| class="note" | 
| class="note" | 
|- class="vcard"
| class="fn org" | Piccotts End
| class="adr" | Hertfordshire
| class="note" | 
| class="note" | 
|- class="vcard"
| class="fn org" | Pickburn
| class="adr" | Doncaster
| class="note" | 
| class="note" | 
|- class="vcard"
| class="fn org" | Picken End
| class="adr" | Herefordshire
| class="note" | 
| class="note" | 
|- class="vcard"
| class="fn org" | Pickering
| class="adr" | North Yorkshire
| class="note" | 
| class="note" | 
|- class="vcard"
| class="fn org" | Pickering Nook
| class="adr" | Durham
| class="note" | 
| class="note" | 
|- class="vcard"
| class="fn org" | Pickerton
| class="adr" | Angus
| class="note" | 
| class="note" | 
|- class="vcard"
| class="fn org" | Picket Hill
| class="adr" | Hampshire
| class="note" | 
| class="note" | 
|- class="vcard"
| class="fn org" | Picket Piece
| class="adr" | Hampshire
| class="note" | 
| class="note" | 
|- class="vcard"
| class="fn org" | Pickett's Lock
| class="adr" | Enfield
| class="note" | 
| class="note" | 
|- class="vcard"
| class="fn org" | Pickford
| class="adr" | Coventry
| class="note" | 
| class="note" | 
|- class="vcard"
| class="fn org" | Pickford Green
| class="adr" | Coventry
| class="note" | 
| class="note" | 
|- class="vcard"
| class="fn org" | Pickhill
| class="adr" | North Yorkshire
| class="note" | 
| class="note" | 
|- class="vcard"
| class="fn org" | Picklenash
| class="adr" | Gloucestershire
| class="note" | 
| class="note" | 
|- class="vcard"
| class="fn org" | Picklescott
| class="adr" | Shropshire
| class="note" | 
| class="note" | 
|- class="vcard"
| class="fn org" | Pickles Hill
| class="adr" | Bradford
| class="note" | 
| class="note" | 
|- class="vcard"
| class="fn org" | Pickley Green
| class="adr" | Wigan
| class="note" | 
| class="note" | 
|- class="vcard"
| class="fn org" | Pickmere
| class="adr" | Cheshire
| class="note" | 
| class="note" | 
|- class="vcard"
| class="fn org" | Pickney
| class="adr" | Somerset
| class="note" | 
| class="note" | 
|- class="vcard"
| class="fn org" | Pickstock
| class="adr" | Shropshire
| class="note" | 
| class="note" | 
|- class="vcard"
| class="fn org" | Pickup Bank
| class="adr" | Lancashire
| class="note" | 
| class="note" | 
|- class="vcard"
| class="fn org" | Pickwell
| class="adr" | Leicestershire
| class="note" | 
| class="note" | 
|- class="vcard"
| class="fn org" | Pickwick
| class="adr" | Wiltshire
| class="note" | 
| class="note" | 
|- class="vcard"
| class="fn org" | Pickwood Scar
| class="adr" | Calderdale
| class="note" | 
| class="note" | 
|- class="vcard"
| class="fn org" | Pickworth
| class="adr" | Lincolnshire
| class="note" | 
| class="note" | 
|- class="vcard"
| class="fn org" | Pickworth
| class="adr" | Rutland
| class="note" | 
| class="note" | 
|- class="vcard"
| class="fn org" | Picton
| class="adr" | Cheshire
| class="note" | 
| class="note" | 
|- class="vcard"
| class="fn org" | Picton
| class="adr" | Flintshire
| class="note" | 
| class="note" | 
|- class="vcard"
| class="fn org" | Picton
| class="adr" | North Yorkshire
| class="note" | 
| class="note" | 
|- class="vcard"
| class="fn org" | Pict's Hill
| class="adr" | Somerset
| class="note" | 
| class="note" | 
|- class="vcard"
| class="fn org" | Piddinghoe
| class="adr" | East Sussex
| class="note" | 
| class="note" | 
|- class="vcard"
| class="fn org" | Piddington
| class="adr" | Northamptonshire
| class="note" | 
| class="note" | 
|- class="vcard"
| class="fn org" | Piddington
| class="adr" | Oxfordshire
| class="note" | 
| class="note" | 
|- class="vcard"
| class="fn org" | Piddington
| class="adr" | Buckinghamshire
| class="note" | 
| class="note" | 
|- class="vcard"
| class="fn org" | Piddlehinton
| class="adr" | Dorset
| class="note" | 
| class="note" | 
|- class="vcard"
| class="fn org" | Piddletrenthide
| class="adr" | Dorset
| class="note" | 
| class="note" | 
|- class="vcard"
| class="fn org" | Pidley
| class="adr" | Cambridgeshire
| class="note" | 
| class="note" | 
|- class="vcard"
| class="fn org" | Pidney
| class="adr" | Dorset
| class="note" | 
| class="note" | 
|- class="vcard"
| class="fn org" | Piece
| class="adr" | Cornwall
| class="note" | 
| class="note" | 
|- class="vcard"
| class="fn org" | Piercebridge
| class="adr" | Darlington
| class="note" | 
| class="note" | 
|- class="vcard"
| class="fn org" | Piercing Hill
| class="adr" | Essex
| class="note" | 
| class="note" | 
|- class="vcard"
| class="fn org" | Pierowall
| class="adr" | Orkney Islands
| class="note" | 
| class="note" | 
|- class="vcard"
| class="fn org" | Piff's Elm
| class="adr" | Gloucestershire
| class="note" | 
| class="note" | 
|- class="vcard"
| class="fn org" | Pigdon
| class="adr" | Northumberland
| class="note" | 
| class="note" | 
|- class="vcard"
| class="fn org" | Pightley
| class="adr" | Somerset
| class="note" | 
| class="note" | 
|- class="vcard"
| class="fn org" | Pig Oak
| class="adr" | Dorset
| class="note" | 
| class="note" | 
|- class="vcard"
| class="fn org" | Pigstye Green
| class="adr" | Essex
| class="note" | 
| class="note" | 
|- class="vcard"
| class="fn org" | Pike End
| class="adr" | Calderdale
| class="note" | 
| class="note" | 
|- class="vcard"
| class="fn org" | Pikehall
| class="adr" | Derbyshire
| class="note" | 
| class="note" | 
|- class="vcard"
| class="fn org" | Pike Hill
| class="adr" | Lancashire
| class="note" | 
| class="note" | 
|- class="vcard"
| class="fn org" | Pike Law
| class="adr" | Calderdale
| class="note" | 
| class="note" | 
|- class="vcard"
| class="fn org" | Pikeshill
| class="adr" | Hampshire
| class="note" | 
| class="note" | 
|- class="vcard"
| class="fn org" | Pikestye
| class="adr" | Herefordshire
| class="note" | 
| class="note" | 
|}

Pil

|- class="vcard"
| class="fn org" | Pilford
| class="adr" | Dorset
| class="note" | 
| class="note" | 
|- class="vcard"
| class="fn org" | Pilgrims Hatch
| class="adr" | Essex
| class="note" | 
| class="note" | 
|- class="vcard"
| class="fn org" | Pilham
| class="adr" | Lincolnshire
| class="note" | 
| class="note" | 
|- class="vcard"
| class="fn org" | Pilhough
| class="adr" | Derbyshire
| class="note" | 
| class="note" | 
|- class="vcard"
| class="fn org" | Pill
| class="adr" | Pembrokeshire
| class="note" | 
| class="note" | 
|- class="vcard"
| class="fn org" | Pill
| class="adr" | North Somerset
| class="note" | 
| class="note" | 
|- class="vcard"
| class="fn org" | Pillaton
| class="adr" | Cornwall
| class="note" | 
| class="note" | 
|- class="vcard"
| class="fn org" | Pillaton
| class="adr" | Staffordshire
| class="note" | 
| class="note" | 
|- class="vcard"
| class="fn org" | Pillerton Hersey
| class="adr" | Warwickshire
| class="note" | 
| class="note" | 
|- class="vcard"
| class="fn org" | Pillerton Priors
| class="adr" | Warwickshire
| class="note" | 
| class="note" | 
|- class="vcard"
| class="fn org" | Pilleth
| class="adr" | Powys
| class="note" | 
| class="note" | 
|- class="vcard"
| class="fn org" | Pilley
| class="adr" | Hampshire
| class="note" | 
| class="note" | 
|- class="vcard"
| class="fn org" | Pilley
| class="adr" | Gloucestershire
| class="note" | 
| class="note" | 
|- class="vcard"
| class="fn org" | Pilley
| class="adr" | Barnsley
| class="note" | 
| class="note" | 
|- class="vcard"
| class="fn org" | Pilley Bailey
| class="adr" | Hampshire
| class="note" | 
| class="note" | 
|- class="vcard"
| class="fn org" | Pillgwenlly
| class="adr" | City of Newport
| class="note" | 
| class="note" | 
|- class="vcard"
| class="fn org" | Pilling
| class="adr" | Lancashire
| class="note" | 
| class="note" | 
|- class="vcard"
| class="fn org" | Pilling Lane
| class="adr" | Lancashire
| class="note" | 
| class="note" | 
|- class="vcard"
| class="fn org" | Pillmouth
| class="adr" | Devon
| class="note" | 
| class="note" | 
|- class="vcard"
| class="fn org" | Pillowell
| class="adr" | Gloucestershire
| class="note" | 
| class="note" | 
|- class="vcard"
| class="fn org" | Pillows Green
| class="adr" | Gloucestershire
| class="note" | 
| class="note" | 
|- class="vcard"
| class="fn org" | Pillwell
| class="adr" | Dorset
| class="note" | 
| class="note" | 
|- class="vcard"
| class="fn org" | Pilmuir
| class="adr" | Moray
| class="note" | 
| class="note" | 
|- class="vcard"
| class="fn org" | Pilmuir
| class="adr" | Scottish Borders
| class="note" | 
| class="note" | 
|- class="vcard"
| class="fn org" | Pilning
| class="adr" | South Gloucestershire
| class="note" | 
| class="note" | 
|- class="vcard"
| class="fn org" | Pilrig
| class="adr" | City of Edinburgh
| class="note" | 
| class="note" | 
|- class="vcard"
| class="fn org" | Pilsdon
| class="adr" | Dorset
| class="note" | 
| class="note" | 
|- class="vcard"
| class="fn org" | Pilsgate
| class="adr" | Cambridgeshire
| class="note" | 
| class="note" | 
|- class="vcard"
| class="fn org" | Pilsley (Derbyshire Dales)
| class="adr" | Derbyshire
| class="note" | 
| class="note" | 
|- class="vcard"
| class="fn org" | Pilsley (North East Derbyshire)
| class="adr" | Derbyshire
| class="note" | 
| class="note" | 
|- class="vcard"
| class="fn org" | Pilsley Green
| class="adr" | Derbyshire
| class="note" | 
| class="note" | 
|- class="vcard"
| class="fn org" | Pilson Green
| class="adr" | Norfolk
| class="note" | 
| class="note" | 
|- class="vcard"
| class="fn org" | Piltdown
| class="adr" | East Sussex
| class="note" | 
| class="note" | 
|- class="vcard"
| class="fn org" | Pilton
| class="adr" | Devon
| class="note" | 
| class="note" | 
|- class="vcard"
| class="fn org" | Pilton
| class="adr" | Somerset
| class="note" | 
| class="note" | 
|- class="vcard"
| class="fn org" | Pilton
| class="adr" | Northamptonshire
| class="note" | 
| class="note" | 
|- class="vcard"
| class="fn org" | Pilton
| class="adr" | Rutland
| class="note" | 
| class="note" | 
|- class="vcard"
| class="fn org" | Pilton
| class="adr" | City of Edinburgh
| class="note" | 
| class="note" | 
|- class="vcard"
| class="fn org" | Pilton Green
| class="adr" | Swansea
| class="note" | 
| class="note" | 
|- class="vcard"
| class="fn org" | Piltown
| class="adr" | Somerset
| class="note" | 
| class="note" | 
|}

Pim–Pip

|- class="vcard"
| class="fn org" | Pimhole
| class="adr" | Bury
| class="note" | 
| class="note" | 
|- class="vcard"
| class="fn org" | Pimlico
| class="adr" | Hertfordshire
| class="note" | 
| class="note" | 
|- class="vcard"
| class="fn org" | Pimlico
| class="adr" | City of Westminster
| class="note" | 
| class="note" | 
|- class="vcard"
| class="fn org" | Pimlico
| class="adr" | Lancashire
| class="note" | 
| class="note" | 
|- class="vcard"
| class="fn org" | Pimperne (North Dorset)
| class="adr" | Dorset
| class="note" | 
| class="note" | 
|- class="vcard"
| class="fn org" | Pimperne (West Dorset)
| class="adr" | Dorset
| class="note" | 
| class="note" | 
|- class="vcard"
| class="fn org" | Pinchbeck
| class="adr" | Lincolnshire
| class="note" | 
| class="note" | 
|- class="vcard"
| class="fn org" | Pinchbeck West
| class="adr" | Lincolnshire
| class="note" | 
| class="note" | 
|- class="vcard"
| class="fn org" | Pincheon Green
| class="adr" | Doncaster
| class="note" | 
| class="note" | 
|- class="vcard"
| class="fn org" | Pinchinthorpe
| class="adr" | Redcar and Cleveland
| class="note" | 
| class="note" | 
|- class="vcard"
| class="fn org" | Pinckney Green
| class="adr" | Wiltshire
| class="note" | 
| class="note" | 
|- class="vcard"
| class="fn org" | Pincock
| class="adr" | Lancashire
| class="note" | 
| class="note" | 
|- class="vcard"
| class="fn org" | Pineham
| class="adr" | Kent
| class="note" | 
| class="note" | 
|- class="vcard"
| class="fn org" | Pineham
| class="adr" | Milton Keynes
| class="note" | 
| class="note" | 
|- class="vcard"
| class="fn org" | Pinehurst
| class="adr" | Swindon
| class="note" | 
| class="note" | 
|- class="vcard"
| class="fn org" | Pinfarthings
| class="adr" | Gloucestershire
| class="note" | 
| class="note" | 
|- class="vcard"
| class="fn org" | Pinfold
| class="adr" | Lancashire
| class="note" | 
| class="note" | 
|- class="vcard"
| class="fn org" | Pinfold Hill
| class="adr" | Barnsley
| class="note" | 
| class="note" | 
|- class="vcard"
| class="fn org" | Pinfoldpond
| class="adr" | Bedfordshire
| class="note" | 
| class="note" | 
|- class="vcard"
| class="fn org" | Pinford End
| class="adr" | Suffolk
| class="note" | 
| class="note" | 
|- class="vcard"
| class="fn org" | Pinged
| class="adr" | Carmarthenshire
| class="note" | 
| class="note" | 
|- class="vcard"
| class="fn org" | Pingewood
| class="adr" | Berkshire
| class="note" | 
| class="note" | 
|- class="vcard"
| class="fn org" | Pin Green
| class="adr" | Hertfordshire
| class="note" | 
| class="note" | 
|- class="vcard"
| class="fn org" | Pinhoe
| class="adr" | Devon
| class="note" | 
| class="note" | 
|- class="vcard"
| class="fn org" | Pinkett's Booth
| class="adr" | Coventry
| class="note" | 
| class="note" | 
|- class="vcard"
| class="fn org" | Pink Green
| class="adr" | Worcestershire
| class="note" | 
| class="note" | 
|- class="vcard"
| class="fn org" | Pinkie Braes
| class="adr" | East Lothian
| class="note" | 
| class="note" | 
|- class="vcard"
| class="fn org" | Pinkney
| class="adr" | Wiltshire
| class="note" | 
| class="note" | 
|- class="vcard"
| class="fn org" | Pinkneys Green
| class="adr" | Berkshire
| class="note" | 
| class="note" | 
|- class="vcard"
| class="fn org" | Pinksmoor
| class="adr" | Somerset
| class="note" | 
| class="note" | 
|- class="vcard"
| class="fn org" | Pinley
| class="adr" | Coventry
| class="note" | 
| class="note" | 
|- class="vcard"
| class="fn org" | Pinley Green
| class="adr" | Warwickshire
| class="note" | 
| class="note" | 
|- class="vcard"
| class="fn org" | Pinmore
| class="adr" | South Ayrshire
| class="note" | 
| class="note" | 
|- class="vcard"
| class="fn org" | Pinnacles
| class="adr" | Essex
| class="note" | 
| class="note" | 
|- class="vcard"
| class="fn org" | Pinner
| class="adr" | Hillingdon
| class="note" | 
| class="note" | 
|- class="vcard"
| class="fn org" | Pinner Green
| class="adr" | Harrow
| class="note" | 
| class="note" | 
|- class="vcard"
| class="fn org" | Pinnerwood Park
| class="adr" | Harrow
| class="note" | 
| class="note" | 
|- class="vcard"
| class="fn org" | Pin's Green
| class="adr" | Worcestershire
| class="note" | 
| class="note" | 
|- class="vcard"
| class="fn org" | Pinsley Green
| class="adr" | Cheshire
| class="note" | 
| class="note" | 
|- class="vcard"
| class="fn org" | Pinstones
| class="adr" | Shropshire
| class="note" | 
| class="note" | 
|- class="vcard"
| class="fn org" | Pinvin
| class="adr" | Worcestershire
| class="note" | 
| class="note" | 
|- class="vcard"
| class="fn org" | Pinwall
| class="adr" | Leicestershire
| class="note" | 
| class="note" | 
|- class="vcard"
| class="fn org" | Pinwherry
| class="adr" | South Ayrshire
| class="note" | 
| class="note" | 
|- class="vcard"
| class="fn org" | Pinxton
| class="adr" | Derbyshire
| class="note" | 
| class="note" | 
|- class="vcard"
| class="fn org" | Pipe and Lyde
| class="adr" | Herefordshire
| class="note" | 
| class="note" | 
|- class="vcard"
| class="fn org" | Pipe Gate
| class="adr" | Shropshire
| class="note" | 
| class="note" | 
|- class="vcard"
| class="fn org" | Pipehill
| class="adr" | Staffordshire
| class="note" | 
| class="note" | 
|- class="vcard"
| class="fn org" | Pipehouse
| class="adr" | Bath and North East Somerset
| class="note" | 
| class="note" | 
|- class="vcard"
| class="fn org" | Piperhill
| class="adr" | Highland
| class="note" | 
| class="note" | 
|- class="vcard"
| class="fn org" | Pipe Ridware
| class="adr" | Staffordshire
| class="note" | 
| class="note" | 
|- class="vcard"
| class="fn org" | Piper's Ash
| class="adr" | Cheshire
| class="note" | 
| class="note" | 
|- class="vcard"
| class="fn org" | Piper's End
| class="adr" | Worcestershire
| class="note" | 
| class="note" | 
|- class="vcard"
| class="fn org" | Piper's Hill
| class="adr" | Worcestershire
| class="note" | 
| class="note" | 
|- class="vcard"
| class="fn org" | Pipers Pool
| class="adr" | Cornwall
| class="note" | 
| class="note" | 
|- class="vcard"
| class="fn org" | Pipewell
| class="adr" | Northamptonshire
| class="note" | 
| class="note" | 
|- class="vcard"
| class="fn org" | Pippacott
| class="adr" | Devon
| class="note" | 
| class="note" | 
|- class="vcard"
| class="fn org" | Pippin Street
| class="adr" | Lancashire
| class="note" | 
| class="note" | 
|- class="vcard"
| class="fn org" | Pipps Hill
| class="adr" | Essex
| class="note" | 
| class="note" | 
|- class="vcard"
| class="fn org" | Pipsden
| class="adr" | Kent
| class="note" | 
| class="note" | 
|}

Pir–Piz

|- class="vcard"
| class="fn org" | Pirbright
| class="adr" | Surrey
| class="note" | 
| class="note" | 
|- class="vcard"
| class="fn org" | Pirbright Camp
| class="adr" | Surrey
| class="note" | 
| class="note" | 
|- class="vcard"
| class="fn org" | Pirnmill
| class="adr" | North Ayrshire
| class="note" | 
| class="note" | 
|- class="vcard"
| class="fn org" | Pirton
| class="adr" | Worcestershire
| class="note" | 
| class="note" | 
|- class="vcard"
| class="fn org" | Pirton
| class="adr" | Hertfordshire
| class="note" | 
| class="note" | 
|- class="vcard"
| class="fn org" | Pisgah
| class="adr" | Ceredigion
| class="note" | 
| class="note" | 
|- class="vcard"
| class="fn org" | Pisgah
| class="adr" | Stirling
| class="note" | 
| class="note" | 
|- class="vcard"
| class="fn org" | Pishill
| class="adr" | Oxfordshire
| class="note" | 
| class="note" | 
|- class="vcard"
| class="fn org" | Pishill Bank
| class="adr" | Oxfordshire
| class="note" | 
| class="note" | 
|- class="vcard"
| class="fn org" | Pismire Hill
| class="adr" | Sheffield
| class="note" | 
| class="note" | 
|- class="vcard"
| class="fn org" | Pistyll
| class="adr" | Gwynedd
| class="note" | 
| class="note" | 
|- class="vcard"
| class="fn org" | Pit
| class="adr" | Monmouthshire
| class="note" | 
| class="note" | 
|- class="vcard"
| class="fn org" | Pitblae
| class="adr" | Aberdeenshire
| class="note" | 
| class="note" | 
|- class="vcard"
| class="fn org" | Pitcairngreen
| class="adr" | Perth and Kinross
| class="note" | 
| class="note" | 
|- class="vcard"
| class="fn org" | Pitcalnie
| class="adr" | Highland
| class="note" | 
| class="note" | 
|- class="vcard"
| class="fn org" | Pitcaple
| class="adr" | Aberdeenshire
| class="note" | 
| class="note" | 
|- class="vcard"
| class="fn org" | Pitchcombe
| class="adr" | Gloucestershire
| class="note" | 
| class="note" | 
|- class="vcard"
| class="fn org" | Pitchcott
| class="adr" | Buckinghamshire
| class="note" | 
| class="note" | 
|- class="vcard"
| class="fn org" | Pitcher's Green
| class="adr" | Suffolk
| class="note" | 
| class="note" | 
|- class="vcard"
| class="fn org" | Pitchford
| class="adr" | Shropshire
| class="note" | 
| class="note" | 
|- class="vcard"
| class="fn org" | Pitch Green
| class="adr" | Buckinghamshire
| class="note" | 
| class="note" | 
|- class="vcard"
| class="fn org" | Pitch Place (Thursley)
| class="adr" | Surrey
| class="note" | 
| class="note" | 
|- class="vcard"
| class="fn org" | Pitch Place (Guildford)
| class="adr" | Surrey
| class="note" | 
| class="note" | 
|- class="vcard"
| class="fn org" | Pitcombe
| class="adr" | Somerset
| class="note" | 
| class="note" | 
|- class="vcard"
| class="fn org" | Pitcorthie
| class="adr" | Fife
| class="note" | 
| class="note" | 
|- class="vcard"
| class="fn org" | Pitcot
| class="adr" | Somerset
| class="note" | 
| class="note" | 
|- class="vcard"
| class="fn org" | Pitcot
| class="adr" | The Vale of Glamorgan
| class="note" | 
| class="note" | 
|- class="vcard"
| class="fn org" | Pitempton
| class="adr" | City of Dundee
| class="note" | 
| class="note" | 
|- class="vcard"
| class="fn org" | Pitfichie
| class="adr" | Aberdeenshire
| class="note" | 
| class="note" | 
|- class="vcard"
| class="fn org" | Pitgrudy
| class="adr" | Highland
| class="note" | 
| class="note" | 
|- class="vcard"
| class="fn org" | Pitlessie
| class="adr" | Fife
| class="note" | 
| class="note" | 
|- class="vcard"
| class="fn org" | Pitlochry
| class="adr" | Perth and Kinross
| class="note" | 
| class="note" | 
|- class="vcard"
| class="fn org" | Pitmaduthy
| class="adr" | Highland
| class="note" | 
| class="note" | 
|- class="vcard"
| class="fn org" | Pitmedden
| class="adr" | Aberdeenshire
| class="note" | 
| class="note" | 
|- class="vcard"
| class="fn org" | Pitminster
| class="adr" | Somerset
| class="note" | 
| class="note" | 
|- class="vcard"
| class="fn org" | Pitmuies
| class="adr" | Angus
| class="note" | 
| class="note" | 
|- class="vcard"
| class="fn org" | Pitmunie
| class="adr" | Aberdeenshire
| class="note" | 
| class="note" | 
|- class="vcard"
| class="fn org" | Pitney
| class="adr" | Somerset
| class="note" | 
| class="note" | 
|- class="vcard"
| class="fn org" | Pitpointie
| class="adr" | Angus
| class="note" | 
| class="note" | 
|- class="vcard"
| class="fn org" | Pitreuchie
| class="adr" | Angus
| class="note" | 
| class="note" | 
|- class="vcard"
| class="fn org" | Pitscottie
| class="adr" | Fife
| class="note" | 
| class="note" | 
|- class="vcard"
| class="fn org" | Pitsea
| class="adr" | Essex
| class="note" | 
| class="note" | 
|- class="vcard"
| class="fn org" | Pitses
| class="adr" | Oldham
| class="note" | 
| class="note" | 
|- class="vcard"
| class="fn org" | Pitsford
| class="adr" | Northamptonshire
| class="note" | 
| class="note" | 
|- class="vcard"
| class="fn org" | Pitsford Hill
| class="adr" | Somerset
| class="note" | 
| class="note" | 
|- class="vcard"
| class="fn org" | Pitsmoor
| class="adr" | Sheffield
| class="note" | 
| class="note" | 
|- class="vcard"
| class="fn org" | Pitstone
| class="adr" | Buckinghamshire
| class="note" | 
| class="note" | 
|- class="vcard"
| class="fn org" | Pitstone Green
| class="adr" | Buckinghamshire
| class="note" | 
| class="note" | 
|- class="vcard"
| class="fn org" | Pitstone Hill
| class="adr" | Buckinghamshire
| class="note" | 
| class="note" | 
|- class="vcard"
| class="fn org" | Pitt
| class="adr" | Hampshire
| class="note" | 
| class="note" | 
|- class="vcard"
| class="fn org" | Pitt Court
| class="adr" | Gloucestershire
| class="note" | 
| class="note" | 
|- class="vcard"
| class="fn org" | Pittentrail
| class="adr" | Highland
| class="note" | 
| class="note" | 
|- class="vcard"
| class="fn org" | Pittenweem
| class="adr" | Fife
| class="note" | 
| class="note" | 
|- class="vcard"
| class="fn org" | Pitteuchar
| class="adr" | Fife
| class="note" | 
| class="note" | 
|- class="vcard"
| class="fn org" | Pittington
| class="adr" | Durham
| class="note" | 
| class="note" | 
|- class="vcard"
| class="fn org" | Pitton
| class="adr" | Wiltshire
| class="note" | 
| class="note" | 
|- class="vcard"
| class="fn org" | Pitton
| class="adr" | Swansea
| class="note" | 
| class="note" | 
|- class="vcard"
| class="fn org" | Pitts Hill
| class="adr" | City of Stoke-on-Trent
| class="note" | 
| class="note" | 
|- class="vcard"
| class="fn org" | Pittswood
| class="adr" | Kent
| class="note" | 
| class="note" | 
|- class="vcard"
| class="fn org" | Pittulie
| class="adr" | Aberdeenshire
| class="note" | 
| class="note" | 
|- class="vcard"
| class="fn org" | Pittville
| class="adr" | Gloucestershire
| class="note" | 
| class="note" | 
|- class="vcard"
| class="fn org" | Pityme
| class="adr" | Cornwall
| class="note" | 
| class="note" | 
|- class="vcard"
| class="fn org" | Pity Me
| class="adr" | Durham
| class="note" | 
| class="note" | 
|- class="vcard"
| class="fn org" | Pixham
| class="adr" | Surrey
| class="note" | 
| class="note" | 
|- class="vcard"
| class="fn org" | Pixham
| class="adr" | Worcestershire
| class="note" | 
| class="note" | 
|- class="vcard"
| class="fn org" | Pixley
| class="adr" | Herefordshire
| class="note" | 
| class="note" | 
|- class="vcard"
| class="fn org" | Pixley
| class="adr" | Shropshire
| class="note" | 
| class="note" | 
|- class="vcard"
| class="fn org" | Pizien Well
| class="adr" | Kent
| class="note" | 
| class="note" | 
|}

Pl

|- class="vcard"
| class="fn org" | Plaidy
| class="adr" | Cornwall
| class="note" | 
| class="note" | 
|- class="vcard"
| class="fn org" | Plaidy
| class="adr" | Aberdeenshire
| class="note" | 
| class="note" | 
|- class="vcard"
| class="fn org" | Plain-an-Gwarry (Redruth)
| class="adr" | Cornwall
| class="note" | 
| class="note" | 
|- class="vcard"
| class="fn org" | Plain-an-Gwarry (St Hilary)
| class="adr" | Cornwall
| class="note" | 
| class="note" | 
|- class="vcard"
| class="fn org" | Plain Dealings
| class="adr" | Pembrokeshire
| class="note" | 
| class="note" | 
|- class="vcard"
| class="fn org" | Plains
| class="adr" | North Lanarkshire
| class="note" | 
| class="note" | 
|- class="vcard"
| class="fn org" | Plainsfield
| class="adr" | Somerset
| class="note" | 
| class="note" | 
|- class="vcard"
| class="fn org" | Plain Spot
| class="adr" | Nottinghamshire
| class="note" | 
| class="note" | 
|- class="vcard"
| class="fn org" | Plain Street
| class="adr" | Cornwall
| class="note" | 
| class="note" | 
|- class="vcard"
| class="fn org" | Plaish
| class="adr" | Shropshire
| class="note" | 
| class="note" | 
|- class="vcard"
| class="fn org" | Plaistow
| class="adr" | West Sussex
| class="note" | 
| class="note" | 
|- class="vcard"
| class="fn org" | Plaistow
| class="adr" | Newham
| class="note" | 
| class="note" | 
|- class="vcard"
| class="fn org" | Plaistow
| class="adr" | Bromley
| class="note" | 
| class="note" | 
|- class="vcard"
| class="fn org" | Plaistow Green
| class="adr" | Essex
| class="note" | 
| class="note" | 
|- class="vcard"
| class="fn org" | Plaitford
| class="adr" | Hampshire
| class="note" | 
| class="note" | 
|- class="vcard"
| class="fn org" | Plaitford Green
| class="adr" | Hampshire
| class="note" | 
| class="note" | 
|- class="vcard"
| class="fn org" | Plank Lane
| class="adr" | Wigan
| class="note" | 
| class="note" | 
|- class="vcard"
| class="fn org" | Plantation Bridge
| class="adr" | Cumbria
| class="note" | 
| class="note" | 
|- class="vcard"
| class="fn org" | Plantationfoot
| class="adr" | Dumfries and Galloway
| class="note" | 
| class="note" | 
|- class="vcard"
| class="fn org" | Plardiwick
| class="adr" | Staffordshire
| class="note" | 
| class="note" | 
|- class="vcard"
| class="fn org" | Plasau
| class="adr" | Shropshire
| class="note" | 
| class="note" | 
|- class="vcard"
| class="fn org" | Plas Berwyn
| class="adr" | Denbighshire
| class="note" | 
| class="note" | 
|- class="vcard"
| class="fn org" | Plas Coch
| class="adr" | Wrexham
| class="note" | 
| class="note" | 
|- class="vcard"
| class="fn org" | Plas Dinam
| class="adr" | Powys
| class="note" | 
| class="note" | 
|- class="vcard"
| class="fn org" | Plas Gogerddan
| class="adr" | Ceredigion
| class="note" | 
| class="note" | 
|- class="vcard"
| class="fn org" | Plashet
| class="adr" | Newham
| class="note" | 
| class="note" | 
|- class="vcard"
| class="fn org" | Plashett
| class="adr" | Carmarthenshire
| class="note" | 
| class="note" | 
|- class="vcard"
| class="fn org" | Plasiolyn
| class="adr" | Powys
| class="note" | 
| class="note" | 
|- class="vcard"
| class="fn org" | Plas Meredydd
| class="adr" | Powys
| class="note" | 
| class="note" | 
|- class="vcard"
| class="fn org" | Plasnewydd
| class="adr" | Powys
| class="note" | 
| class="note" | 
|- class="vcard"
| class="fn org" | Plaster's Green
| class="adr" | Bath and North East Somerset
| class="note" | 
| class="note" | 
|- class="vcard"
| class="fn org" | Plastow Green
| class="adr" | Hampshire
| class="note" | 
| class="note" | 
|- class="vcard"
| class="fn org" | Platt
| class="adr" | Kent
| class="note" | 
| class="note" | 
|- class="vcard"
| class="fn org" | Platt Bridge
| class="adr" | Wigan
| class="note" | 
| class="note" | 
|- class="vcard"
| class="fn org" | Platt Lane
| class="adr" | Shropshire
| class="note" | 
| class="note" | 
|- class="vcard"
| class="fn org" | Platts Common
| class="adr" | Barnsley
| class="note" | 
| class="note" | 
|- class="vcard"
| class="fn org" | Platt's Heath
| class="adr" | Kent
| class="note" | 
| class="note" | 
|- class="vcard"
| class="fn org" | Plawsworth
| class="adr" | Durham
| class="note" | 
| class="note" | 
|- class="vcard"
| class="fn org" | Plaxtol
| class="adr" | Kent
| class="note" | 
| class="note" | 
|- class="vcard"
| class="fn org" | Playden
| class="adr" | East Sussex
| class="note" | 
| class="note" | 
|- class="vcard"
| class="fn org" | Playford
| class="adr" | Suffolk
| class="note" | 
| class="note" | 
|- class="vcard"
| class="fn org" | Play Hatch
| class="adr" | Oxfordshire
| class="note" | 
| class="note" | 
|- class="vcard"
| class="fn org" | Playing Place
| class="adr" | Cornwall
| class="note" | 
| class="note" | 
|- class="vcard"
| class="fn org" | Playley Green
| class="adr" | Gloucestershire
| class="note" | 
| class="note" | 
|- class="vcard"
| class="fn org" | Plealey
| class="adr" | Shropshire
| class="note" | 
| class="note" | 
|- class="vcard"
| class="fn org" | Pleamore Cross
| class="adr" | Somerset
| class="note" | 
| class="note" | 
|- class="vcard"
| class="fn org" | Plean
| class="adr" | Stirling
| class="note" | 
| class="note" | 
|- class="vcard"
| class="fn org" | Pleasant Valley
| class="adr" | Pembrokeshire
| class="note" | 
| class="note" | 
|- class="vcard"
| class="fn org" | Pleasington
| class="adr" | Lancashire
| class="note" | 
| class="note" | 
|- class="vcard"
| class="fn org" | Pleasley
| class="adr" | Derbyshire
| class="note" | 
| class="note" | 
|- class="vcard"
| class="fn org" | Pleasleyhill
| class="adr" | Nottinghamshire
| class="note" | 
| class="note" | 
|- class="vcard"
| class="fn org" | Pleck (Marnhull)
| class="adr" | Dorset
| class="note" | 
| class="note" | 
|- class="vcard"
| class="fn org" | Pleck (or Little Ansty)
| class="adr" | Dorset
| class="note" | 
| class="note" | 
|- class="vcard"
| class="fn org" | Pleck (Holwell)
| class="adr" | Dorset
| class="note" | 
| class="note" | 
|- class="vcard"
| class="fn org" | Pleck
| class="adr" | Walsall
| class="note" | 
| class="note" | 
|- class="vcard"
| class="fn org" | Pleckgate
| class="adr" | Lancashire
| class="note" | 
| class="note" | 
|- class="vcard"
| class="fn org" | Pledgdon Green
| class="adr" | Essex
| class="note" | 
| class="note" | 
|- class="vcard"
| class="fn org" | Pledwick
| class="adr" | Wakefield
| class="note" | 
| class="note" | 
|- class="vcard"
| class="fn org" | Plemstall
| class="adr" | Cheshire
| class="note" | 
| class="note" | 
|- class="vcard"
| class="fn org" | Plenmeller
| class="adr" | Northumberland
| class="note" | 
| class="note" | 
|- class="vcard"
| class="fn org" | Pleshey
| class="adr" | Essex
| class="note" | 
| class="note" | 
|- class="vcard"
| class="fn org" | Plockton
| class="adr" | Highland
| class="note" | 
| class="note" | 
|- class="vcard"
| class="fn org" | Plocrapool / Plocropol
| class="adr" | Western Isles
| class="note" | 
| class="note" | 
|- class="vcard"
| class="fn org" | Plompton
| class="adr" | North Yorkshire
| class="note" | 
| class="note" | 
|- class="vcard"
| class="fn org" | Plot Gate
| class="adr" | Somerset
| class="note" | 
| class="note" | 
|- class="vcard"
| class="fn org" | Plot Street
| class="adr" | Somerset
| class="note" | 
| class="note" | 
|- class="vcard"
| class="fn org" | Plough Hill
| class="adr" | Warwickshire
| class="note" | 
| class="note" | 
|- class="vcard"
| class="fn org" | Plowden
| class="adr" | Shropshire
| class="note" | 
| class="note" | 
|- class="vcard"
| class="fn org" | Ploxgreen
| class="adr" | Shropshire
| class="note" | 
| class="note" | 
|- class="vcard"
| class="fn org" | Pluckley
| class="adr" | Kent
| class="note" | 
| class="note" | 
|- class="vcard"
| class="fn org" | Pluckley Thorne
| class="adr" | Kent
| class="note" | 
| class="note" | 
|- class="vcard"
| class="fn org" | Plucks Gutter
| class="adr" | Kent
| class="note" | 
| class="note" | 
|- class="vcard"
| class="fn org" | Plumbland
| class="adr" | Cumbria
| class="note" | 
| class="note" | 
|- class="vcard"
| class="fn org" | Plumbley
| class="adr" | Sheffield
| class="note" | 
| class="note" | 
|- class="vcard"
| class="fn org" | Plumford
| class="adr" | Kent
| class="note" | 
| class="note" | 
|- class="vcard"
| class="fn org" | Plumley
| class="adr" | Cheshire
| class="note" | 
| class="note" | 
|- class="vcard"
| class="fn org" | Plump Hill
| class="adr" | Gloucestershire
| class="note" | 
| class="note" | 
|- class="vcard"
| class="fn org" | Plumpton
| class="adr" | East Sussex
| class="note" | 
| class="note" | 
|- class="vcard"
| class="fn org" | Plumpton
| class="adr" | Northamptonshire
| class="note" | 
| class="note" | 
|- class="vcard"
| class="fn org" | Plumpton
| class="adr" | Cumbria
| class="note" | 
| class="note" | 
|- class="vcard"
| class="fn org" | Plumpton End
| class="adr" | Northamptonshire
| class="note" | 
| class="note" | 
|- class="vcard"
| class="fn org" | Plumptonfoot
| class="adr" | Cumbria
| class="note" | 
| class="note" | 
|- class="vcard"
| class="fn org" | Plumpton Green
| class="adr" | East Sussex
| class="note" | 
| class="note" | 
|- class="vcard"
| class="fn org" | Plumstead
| class="adr" | Greenwich
| class="note" | 
| class="note" | 
|- class="vcard"
| class="fn org" | Plumstead
| class="adr" | Norfolk
| class="note" | 
| class="note" | 
|- class="vcard"
| class="fn org" | Plumstead Common
| class="adr" | Greenwich
| class="note" | 
| class="note" | 
|- class="vcard"
| class="fn org" | Plumstead Green
| class="adr" | Norfolk
| class="note" | 
| class="note" | 
|- class="vcard"
| class="fn org" | Plumtree
| class="adr" | Nottinghamshire
| class="note" | 
| class="note" | 
|- class="vcard"
| class="fn org" | Plumtree Green
| class="adr" | Kent
| class="note" | 
| class="note" | 
|- class="vcard"
| class="fn org" | Plumtree Park
| class="adr" | Nottinghamshire
| class="note" | 
| class="note" | 
|- class="vcard"
| class="fn org" | Plungar
| class="adr" | Leicestershire
| class="note" | 
| class="note" | 
|- class="vcard"
| class="fn org" | Plush
| class="adr" | Dorset
| class="note" | 
| class="note" | 
|- class="vcard"
| class="fn org" | Plusha
| class="adr" | Cornwall
| class="note" | 
| class="note" | 
|- class="vcard"
| class="fn org" | Plushabridge
| class="adr" | Cornwall
| class="note" | 
| class="note" | 
|- class="vcard"
| class="fn org" | Plusterwine
| class="adr" | Gloucestershire
| class="note" | 
| class="note" | 
|- class="vcard"
| class="fn org" | Plwmp
| class="adr" | Ceredigion
| class="note" | 
| class="note" | 
|- class="vcard"
| class="fn org" | Plymouth
| class="adr" | City of Plymouth
| class="note" | 
| class="note" | 
|- class="vcard"
| class="fn org" | Plympton
| class="adr" | Devon
| class="note" | 
| class="note" | 
|- class="vcard"
| class="fn org" | Plymstock
| class="adr" | Devon
| class="note" | 
| class="note" | 
|- class="vcard"
| class="fn org" | Plymtree
| class="adr" | Devon
| class="note" | 
| class="note" | 
|}